Heart of Asia Channel, known on-air as Heart of Asia, is a Philippine free-to-air television channel owned by GMA Network Inc. The channel was on test broadcast from June 12 until June 28, 2020, and was officially launched on June 29, 2020. It operates daily starting at 06:00 (PST) with sign-off  at 00:00 (PST).

Overview

Background
Heart of Asia is inspired from the programming block of the same name by GMA Network that airs Filipino-dubbed Asian dramas.

Heart of Asia Channel airs Asian dramas that have been broadcast on its sister channels, GMA and GTV (formerly QTV/Q and GMA News TV) along with channel-only exclusive Asian dramas that never been aired on the aforementioned channels. The channel also airs local dramas previously broadcast on GMA, as well as local and Asian films broadcast on GMA, GTV and I Heart Movies.

Plans
In 2019, GMA Network, Inc. has announced its plans to invest for its second phase its transition to digital television, including partnering with American entertainment company JungoTV and Philippine media company Solar Entertainment Corporation (SEC) to distribute content in across all its channels. In preparation of releasing a self-patented digital television box named GMA Affordabox, and as part of its 70th founding anniversary, GMA Network launched a new channel, Heart of Asia, which its plans to include in their digital channel lineup of DZBB-DTV Channel 15.

Launch
On June 7, 2020, GMA Network announced to the audiences to re-scan their digital TV boxes on June 12, 2020, to receive their new channel lineup which includes GMA, GMA News TV and Heart of Asia Channel. The channel plans to air dramas shown on GMA Network's The Heart of Asia and FantaSeries programming blocks, as well as GMA-produced drama programs previously aired on cable/satellite channel Fox Filipino, jointly run with Fox Networks Group, and local and Asian movies.

Heart of Asia Channel was on test broadcast on June 12, 2020, airing provisional programs while showing promotional plugs for the upcoming programs with assigned programming blocks. The channel debuted on June 29 with regular programming.

Programming

The channel's programming blocks are listed in alphabetical order:

Current
 Absolutely Asian — the channel's secondary programming block consisting of mixed Asian dramas. It was formerly known as Asian Invasion.
 Action Flicks — a film presentation of Asian action films.
 Asian CineMix — a film presentation of mixed Asian films.
 ATINovelas — a programming block featuring Filipino dramas by GMA Network. ATINovelas is a portmanteau of Filipino words "atin" ("our own") and "novelas".
 Feel na Films — a film presentation of Asian romance and drama films.
 Heart of the World — a programming block featuring foreign telenovelas.
 K-Feels — the channel's primary programming block featuring Korean dramas only. K-Feels is a shortened term for "Korean feels".
 Strictly Pinoy — a film presentation of local Filipino films.

Former
 Screams on Screen — a film presentation of Asian horror and mystery films.

Ratings
According to GMA Network's CEO and Chairman Felipe L. Gozon, the Heart of Asia channel ranked fifth in the ratings scoreboard, garnering a 4.9% audience share during the first quarter of 2021.

See also
List of programs broadcast by GMA Network
List of programs previously broadcast by GMA Network
List of programs broadcast by GTV (Philippine TV network)
List of programs aired by QTV, Q, GMA News TV and GTV

References

External links
 

GMA Network
GMA Network (company) channels
Filipino-language television stations
Television networks in the Philippines
Television channels and stations established in 2020
2020 establishments in the Philippines